Leonardo Romero (1930 - June 2, 1986) was the first bishop of the Diocese of Northern Mexico in the Anglican Church of Mexico.  He also served the Anglican Church in El Salvador.

References

1930 births
1986 deaths
Anglican bishops of Northern Mexico